Yang Yue (born 1983) is a Paralympian athlete from China competing mainly in category F42-46 discus throw events.

She competed in the 2004 Summer Paralympics in Athens, Greece where she competed unsuccessfully in both the F42-46 discus and javelin.

She also competed in the 2008 Summer Paralympics in Beijing, China. There she won a silver medal in the women's F42-46 discus throw event as part of a Chinese clean sweep of medals.

External links
 

Paralympic athletes of China
Athletes (track and field) at the 2004 Summer Paralympics
Athletes (track and field) at the 2008 Summer Paralympics
Paralympic silver medalists for China
Living people
Chinese female discus throwers
Medalists at the 2008 Summer Paralympics
Medalists at the 2012 Summer Paralympics
Athletes (track and field) at the 2012 Summer Paralympics
1983 births
Paralympic medalists in athletics (track and field)
21st-century Chinese women